In information theory, the asymptotic equipartition property (AEP) is a general property of the output samples of a stochastic source. It is fundamental to the concept of typical set used in theories of data compression.

Roughly speaking, the theorem states that although there are many series of results that may be produced by a random process, the one actually produced is most probably from a loosely defined set of outcomes that all have approximately the same chance of being the one actually realized. (This is a consequence of the law of large numbers and ergodic theory.) Although there are individual outcomes which have a higher probability than any outcome in this set, the vast number of outcomes in the set almost guarantees that the outcome will come from the set. One way of intuitively understanding the property is through Cramér's large deviation theorem, which states that the probability of a large deviation from mean decays exponentially with the number of samples. Such results are studied in large deviations theory; intuitively, it is the large deviations that would violate equipartition, but these are unlikely.

In the field of pseudorandom number generation, a candidate generator of undetermined quality whose output sequence lies too far outside the typical set by some statistical criteria is rejected as insufficiently random. Thus, although the typical set is loosely defined, practical notions arise concerning sufficient typicality.

Definition 
Given a discrete-time stationary ergodic stochastic process  on the probability space , the asymptotic equipartition property is an assertion that

The asymptotic equipartition property is proved for finite-valued (i.e. ) stationary ergodic stochastic processes in the Shannon–McMillan–Breiman theorem using the ergodic theory and for any i.i.d. sources directly using the law of large numbers in both the discrete-valued case (where  is simply the entropy of a symbol) and the continuous-valued case (where H is the differential entropy instead). The definition of the asymptotic equipartition property can also be extended for certain classes of continuous-time stochastic processes for which a typical set exists for long enough observation time. The convergence is proven almost sure in all cases.

Discrete-time i.i.d. sources 
Given  is an i.i.d. source which may take values in the alphabet , its time series  is i.i.d. with entropy . The weak law of large numbers gives the asymptotic equipartition property with convergence in probability,

since the entropy is equal to the expectation of 

The strong law of large numbers asserts the stronger almost sure convergence,

Discrete-time finite-valued stationary ergodic sources 
Consider a finite-valued sample space , i.e. , for the discrete-time stationary ergodic process  defined on the probability space . The asymptotic equipartition property for such stochastic source is known as the Shannon–McMillan–Breiman theorem, due to Claude Shannon, Brockway McMillan, and Leo Breiman.

Non-stationary discrete-time source producing independent symbols 
The assumptions of stationarity/ergodicity/identical distribution of random variables is not essential for the asymptotic equipartition property to hold. Indeed, as is quite clear intuitively, the asymptotic equipartition property requires only some form of the law of large numbers to hold, which is fairly general. However, the expression needs to be suitably generalized, and the conditions need to be formulated precisely.

We assume that the source is producing independent symbols, with possibly different output statistics at each instant. We assume that the statistics of the process are known completely, that is, the marginal distribution of the process seen at each time instant is known. The joint distribution is just the product of marginals. Then, under the condition (which can be relaxed) that  for all i, for some M > 0, the following holds (AEP):

where

Applications 
The asymptotic equipartition property for non-stationary discrete-time independent process leads us to (among other results) the source coding theorem for non-stationary source (with independent output symbols) and noisy-channel coding theorem for non-stationary memoryless channels.

Continuous-time stationary ergodic sources 
Discrete-time functions can be interpolated to continuous-time functions. If the asymptotic equipartition property holds for the discrete-time process, as in the i.i.d. or finite-valued stationary ergodic cases shown above, it automatically holds for the continuous-time stationary process derived from it by some measurable interpolation. i.e.

An important class of such continuous-time stationary process is the bandlimited stationary ergodic process with the sample space being a subset of the continuous  functions. The asymptotic equipartition property holds if the process is white, in which case the time samples are i.i.d., or there exists T > 1/2W, where W is the nominal bandwidth, such that the T-spaced time samples take values in a finite set, in which case we have the discrete-time finite-valued stationary ergodic process.

Any time-invariant operations also preserves the asymptotic equipartition property, stationarity and ergodicity and we may easily turn a stationary process to non-stationary without losing the asymptotic equipartition property by nulling out a finite number of time samples in the process.

Category theory
A category theoretic definition for the equipartition property is given by Gromov. Given a sequence of Cartesian powers  of a measure space P, this sequence admits an asymptotically equivalent sequence HN of homogeneous measure spaces (i.e. all sets have the same measure; all morphisms are invariant under the group of automorphisms, and thus factor as a morphism to the terminal object) .

The above requires a definition of asymptotic equivalence. This is given in terms of a distance function, giving how much an injective correspondence differs from an isomorphism. Then define

where |S| denotes the measure of a set S.  In what follows, the measure of P and Q are taken to be 1, so that the measure spaces are probability spaces. This distance  is commonly known as the earth mover's distance or Wasserstein metric.

Similarly, define

with  taken to be the counting measure on P.  Thus, this definition requires that P be a finite measure space.  Finally, let

A sequence of injective correspondences  are then asymptotically equivalent when

Given a homogenous space sequence HN that is asymptotically equivalent to PN, the entropy H(P) of P may be taken as

See also
 Cramér's theorem (large deviations)
 Shannon's source coding theorem
 Noisy-channel coding theorem

Notes

References

Journal articles 
 Claude E. Shannon. "A Mathematical Theory of Communication". Bell System Technical Journal, July/October 1948.
 
 Sergio Verdu and Te Sun Han. "The Role of the Asymptotic Equipartition Property in Noiseless Source Coding."  IEEE Transactions on Information Theory, 43(3): 847–857, 1997.

Textbooks 
 
 

Information theory
Theorems in statistics